Rontez Lamotte Miles (born November 25, 1988) is a former American football strong safety. He was signed by the Jets as an undrafted free agent in 2013. He played college football at California (PA).

Early years 

Miles attended Woodland Hills High School in Pennsylvania. He was teammates with future NFL'ers Rob Gronkowski and Monte Simmons. He was also a three-year letterman, two-time all-conference and Big 33 while at Woodland Hills.

College career

Freshman season 

On November 11, 2009, he was named the PSAC West Freshman of the Year. On November 18, 2009, he was selected to the PSAC West Second-team.

Sophomore season 

He was selected to the Football Gazette Third-team All-Region team. He was also selected to the All-PSAC West First-team.

Junior season 

On August 22, 2011, he was selected to the preseason D2Football.com First-team All-American team. He was selected to the AFCA First-team All-American and AP First-team All-American team. He was named to the 2011 All-PSAC West First-team. He selected to the All-American, Don Hansen Second-team All-American, Daktronics First-team All-Region and Don Hansen First-team All-Region team following the conclusion of his Junior season. On November 16, 2011, he was selected as the PSAC West Defensive Player of the Year. He was selected as the Daktronics Super Region 1 Defensive Player of the Year.

Senior season 

Prior to his Senior year, he was selected to the Preseason Lindy’s First-team All-American and Preseason Beyond Sport Network (BSN) First-team All-American team.

Professional career

New York Jets
On April 27, 2013, he signed with the New York Jets as an undrafted free agent. He was released on August 31, 2013. He was signed to the team's practice squad a day later. He was promoted to the active roster on November 1, 2013. He was released 10 days later after suspended tight end Kellen Winslow II returned to the active roster. He was re-signed to the practice squad on November 13, 2013. Miles was released on August 30, 2014 and signed to the team's practice squad a day later.

He was promoted to the Jets' active roster before the Jets' Week 17 season finale, and according to former head coach Rex Ryan, Miles was going to play a role on special teams. However, Miles suffered a leg injury in practice, after colliding with Marcus Williams. Miles was placed on injured reserve after undergoing surgery on December 26, 2014. On December 6, 2015, Miles recorded his first career interception against New York Giants quarterback Eli Manning on fourth down in the 4th quarter which helped the team comeback from a ten-point deficit in their overtime win against the New York Giants.

On March 14, 2018, the Jets placed a second-round restricted free agent tender on Miles. He re-signed for one year and just over $1 million, and later had surgery related to a torn meniscus. He was placed on the physically unable to perform list on September 1, 2018 to start the season due to the knee surgery. He was activated off PUP on November 2, 2018.

On November 6, 2019, Miles was placed on injured reserve with neck and hip injuries.

References

External links 
California (PA) bio
New York Jets bio

Living people
1988 births
New York Jets players
American football safeties
California Vulcans football players
People from Braddock, Pennsylvania
Players of American football from Pennsylvania
Sportspeople from the Pittsburgh metropolitan area
Ed Block Courage Award recipients